Sorcha is a Gaelic feminine given name. It is common to both the Irish and Scottish Gaelic languages, and is derived from the Old Irish word sorchae, soirche meaning "brightness".

In Scotland, Sorcha has traditionally been Anglicised as Clara, which retains the name's Gaelic meaning: the English Clara is derived from the Latin clarus, meaning "bright", "famous".

Notable people with the name Sorcha
 Sorcha Boru (1900–2006), American potter
 Sorca Clarke, Irish politician
 Sorcha Cusack (born 1949), Irish actress
 Sorcha Groundsell (born 1998), Scottish actress
 Sorcha MacMahon (1888–1970), Irish nationalist and republican
 Sorca McGrath, Irish musician
 Sorcha Ní Chéide, Irish actress
 Sorcha Ní Ghuairim (1911–1976), Irish teacher, author, Sean-nós singer
 Sorcha Richardson, Irish singer-songwriter

See also
List of Irish-language given names

External links
 http://medievalscotland.org/kmo/AnnalsIndex/Feminine/Sorcha.shtml

References

Irish feminine given names
Irish-language feminine given names
Scottish feminine given names
Scottish Gaelic feminine given names